Luke Evangelista (born February 21, 2002) is a Canadian professional ice hockey forward currently playing for the  Nashville Predators of the National Hockey League (NHL). He was selected 42nd overall by the Predators in the 2020 NHL Entry Draft.

Playing career 
Evaneglista played as a youth with the Oakville Rangers in the SCTA before playing major junior hockey with London Knights in the Ontario Hockey League (OHL). He was selected in the second round, 42nd overall, of the 2020 NHL Entry Draft by the Nashville Predators.

With the following 2020–21 OHL season firstly delayed and later cancelled due to the COVID-19 Pandemic, he was signed to a three-year, entry-level contract with the Predators on November 9, 2020. With the resumption of professional hockey Evangelista joined the Predators AHL affiliate, the Milwaukee Admirals, and made his professional debut in registering 4 assists through 14 regular season games.

Evangelista returned to junior hockey for the 2021–22 season, captaining the Knights and leading the team in all offensive categories with a league leading 55 goals and 56 assists for 111 points in only 62 regular season games.

After participating in the 2022 Nashville Predators training camp, Evangelista was reassigned to begin the  season with the Admirals. With his offensive game translating to the professional ranks, Evangelista immediately assumed a role on the Admirals top scoring line and was leading the team in scoring when selected to represent the team at the AHL All-Star Classic. On February 28, 2023, Evangelista received his first recall by the Predators and made his NHL debut against the Pittsburgh Penguins that night in a 3–1 defeat. In the following games he recorded his first point, an assist on a goal to Matt Duchene, in a 2–1 victory over the Florida Panthers on March 3, 2023. In increasing his ice-time, Evangelista notched his first two goals of his career against the Vancouver Canucks in a 4–3 shootout defeat on March 7, 2023.

Personal life
Luke is the son of Andrew and Margaret Evangelista and has two sisters, Maria and Sophia.

Career statistics

Regular season and playoffs

International

Awards and honours

References

External links
 

2002 births
Living people
London Knights players
Milwaukee Admirals players
Nashville Predators draft picks
Nashville Predators players